is a Japanese illustrator who helped to influence the Gothic Lolita look through her illustrations, particularly as the cover illustrator for the first eight volumes of the Gothic & Lolita Bible. In 1994, she won a contest in the Japanese manga magazine Feel Young with her debut , later published by Shodensha in her short story collection .

She resides in Osaka, Japan.

Bibliography

Manga
(1994–97, Shodensha, 1 volume, ; English translation, 2007)
(1994–98, Shodensha, 3 volumes)
(1997–2001, Shodensha, 1 volume, ; English translation, 2006)
(1998–2002, Shodensha, 6 volumes; English translation, 2004)
(1998–2002, Shodensha, 1 volume, ; English translation, 2006)
R.I.P.: Requiem in Phonybrian(1999–2000, 1 volume; English translation, 2006)
(2002–05, Feel Young, Shodensha, 5 volumes; English translation, 2006)
(5 volumes; 5th volume)
(2006, Shodensha, 1 volume)

Source:

Art collections
Alice Addict
Chocolate

Card box
Coffin of Fools

References

External links

 
1970 births
Living people
People from Hiroshima
Lolita fashion
Japanese female comics artists
Japanese women illustrators
Women manga artists
Female comics writers
20th-century Japanese women writers
21st-century Japanese women writers